Wohlmirstedt is a village and a former municipality in the Burgenlandkreis district, in Saxony-Anhalt, Germany. Since 1 July 2009, it is part of the municipality Kaiserpfalz.

The first reference to Wohlmirstedt (Wolmerstede) is for 786. In 998 it came into possession of Memleben Abbey.

Sights 
 Protestant Church St. Maria Magdalena (early 16th century)

References 

Former municipalities in Saxony-Anhalt
Burgenlandkreis